Benito Ros Charral (born 2 May 1981 in Abárzuza) is a Spanish mountain bike trials cyclist. He won the 20-inch trials at the world championships eight times between 2003 and 2014, as well as seven team trials world championships.

In 2011, after the world championship he won, he tested positive for prednisolone, a corticosteroid. He was suspended for two years, from September 2011 to September 2013, and was stripped of his 2011 and 2012 world titles.

References

1981 births
Living people
Spanish male cyclists
Mountain bike trials riders
People from Estella Oriental
Cyclists from Navarre